The given name Jarrett is a variant of the name Gerard, and has an English origin meaning Spear Brave.

Notable people with the given names "Jarrett" or "Jarret" include
Jarrett Allen (born 1998), American basketball player
Jarrett Barrios (born 1968), American politician
Jarrett Bellini (born 1978), American writer
Jarrett Boykin (born 1989), American football player
Jarret Brachman, American policy advisor
Jarrett Brown (born 1987), American football player
Jarrett Burton (born 1990), Canadian ice hockey player
Jarrett Bush (born 1984), American football player
Jarrett Byers (born 1985), American football player
Jarrett Campbell, Canadian comedian
Jarrett Coleman (born 1990), American politician
Jarrett Culver (born 1999), American basketball player
Jarret Davis (born 1989), Belizean footballer
Jarret DeHart (born 1994), American baseball coach
Jarrett Deuling (born 1974), Canadian ice hockey player
Jarrett Durham (born 1949), American basketball player
Jarret Eaton (born 1989), American track athlete
Jarrett Guarantano (born 1997), American football player
Jarrett Grube (born 1981), American baseball player
Jarrett Hart (born 1980), British basketball player
Jarrett Hicks (born 1984), American football player
Jarrett Hoffpauir (born 1983), American baseball player
Jarrett Hurd (born 1990), American boxer
Jarrett Irons, American football player
Jarrett Jack (born 1983), American basketball player
Jarret Johnson (born 1981), American football player
Jarrett Keohokalole (born 1983), American politician
Jarrett J. Krosoczka (born 1977), American author
Jarrett Lee (born 1989), American football player
Jarrett Maier (born 1998), American actor
Jarret Myer (born 1973), American entrepreneur
Jarrett Parker (born 1989), American baseball player
Jaret Patterson (born 1999), American football player
Jarrett Payton (born 1980), American football player
Jarrett Perry, American para-swimmer
Jarrett Rivers (born 1993), English footballer
Jarrett Schaefer (born 1979), American film director
Jarrett Stidham (born 1996), American football player
Jarret Stoll (born 1982), Canadian ice hockey player
Jarrett Subloo (born 2000), Australian rugby league footballer
Jarret Thomas (born 1981), American snowboarder
Jarrett Walker (born 1962), American transit consultant
Jarrett Williams (born 1984), American comic book writer
Jarret Zukiwsky (born 1972), Canadian ice hockey player

See also 
Jarrett (disambiguation), a disambiguation page for "Jarrett"
Jarrett (surname), a page for people with the surname "Jarrett"

References